Adam Lyons Schlesinger (October 31, 1967 – April 1, 2020) was an American musician, songwriter, composer, and record producer. He was a founding member of the bands Fountains of Wayne, Ivy, and Tinted Windows, and was a key songwriting contributor and producer for Brooklyn-based synth-pop duo Fever High. He also wrote songs for television and film, for which he won three Emmy Awards, a Grammy Award, and the ASCAP Pop Music Award, and was nominated for Academy, Tony, and Golden Globe Awards.

Early life
Schlesinger was born in New York City on October 31, 1967, the son of publicist Barbara (née Bernthal) and Stephen Schlesinger. He was a cousin of actor Jon Bernthal and the grandson of musician Murray Bernthal (1911–2010). He was raised in a secular Jewish family in the Manhattan borough of New York City and Montclair, New Jersey, attending Montclair High School in the latter. He received a Bachelor of Arts in philosophy from Williams College in Williamstown, Massachusetts.

Songwriting

Film
In addition to writing and co-producing the title song to That Thing You Do!, Schlesinger composed "Master of the Seas" for Ice Age: Continental Drift, performed by Jennifer Lopez, Peter Dinklage and others. He wrote and produced three songs for Music and Lyrics, and his music has also been featured in films such as Shallow Hal (which he scored with Ivy); Robots; There's Something About Mary; Me, Myself & Irene; Josie and the Pussycats; Scary Movie; Art School Confidential; Fever Pitch; The Manchurian Candidate; Because of Winn-Dixie; Orange County; Two Weeks Notice; and others.

Songs performed by other artists
 "Our Own World", "I Was There", and "House of Broken Gingerbread" by The Monkees
 "Just the Girl" and "I'll Take My Chances" for The Click Five
 "Everybody Loves Music" by Nicki Minaj, Pat Monahan, and Ken Jeong on The Billboard Music Awards
 "I Guess It's American" for Superdrag (co-written with John Davis)
 "High School Never Ends" with Bowling for Soup (co-written with Jaret Reddick)
 "I Am What I Am" for the Jonas Brothers
 "Hackensack" (Fountains of Wayne cover) by Katy Perry
 "Perfect Night" by Sarah Silverman and will.i.am
 "1-800 Clap Your Hands", "Marisol", "You Get Me Through", "Double Talk", and "Jerkface Loser Boyfriend" by Emily Osment
 "Work to Do" for America
 Eight songs for Stephen Colbert's television special A Colbert Christmas: The Greatest Gift of All! performed by Stephen Colbert, Jon Stewart, Feist, John Legend, Willie Nelson, Elvis Costello and Toby Keith (co-written with David Javerbaum)
 "Barbie Eat a Sandwich" and "My Problems" with Care Bears on Fire
 "A Little More Us" by Stereo Skyline
 "Just Like a Rockstar" by The Fresh Beat Band
 "Stay in Our PJs" by Big Time Rush
 "I'll Say It" by Kathy Griffin
 "Text Me Merry Christmas" by Straight No Chaser feat. Kristen Bell
 "Tantalized", "All Work", "That's So Typical", "Spit It Out", and "Looks Good on Paper" by Fever High

In theatre
Schlesinger and The Daily Show executive producer David Javerbaum co-wrote the songs for the musical theater adaptation of the John Waters film Cry-Baby. Cry-Baby debuted at the La Jolla Playhouse in La Jolla, California in November 2007. Previews for the Broadway run began at the Marquis Theatre on March 15, 2008. Its official opening night was April 24, 2008.

Schlesinger and Javerbaum co-wrote the closing song "I Have Faith in You" for Javerbaum's play An Act of God, which opened on Broadway on May 28, 2015. The song is performed by Jim Parsons, Chris Fitzgerald, and Tim Kazurinsky.

Schlesinger and Sarah Silverman collaborated on a musical titled The Bedwetter, based on her book of the same name. The musical was set for previews to begin on May 9, 2020, at the Atlantic's Linda Gross Theater; opening night was scheduled for Wednesday, June 10, 2020. The dates were later postponed due to the COVID-19 pandemic. The musical ultimately premiered in previews in April 2022. At the time of his death, Schlesinger was also announced to be working on the music for a stage adaption of the television series The Nanny.

In television
Schlesinger and Javerbaum co-wrote the opening number of the 2011 Tony Awards ceremony "It's Not Just for Gays Anymore" as well as the opening and closing numbers of the 2012 Tony Awards, "What If Life Were More Like Theater" and "If I Had Time", all performed by Neil Patrick Harris. They wrote "TV Is a Vast Wonderland", the opening number of the 2011 Emmy Awards, performed by Jane Lynch and "The Number in the Middle of the Show", performed at the 2013 Emmy Awards by Neil Patrick Harris, Sarah Silverman, and Nathan Fillion.

Schlesinger's television composing work includes theme music, songs, and/or score for I Love You, America (Hulu), The Maya Rudolph Show (NBC), A Colbert Christmas: The Greatest Gift of All!, the 2011 and 2012 Tony Awards, the 2011 and 2013 Emmy Awards, Big Time Rush, T.U.F.F. Puppy (Nickelodeon), Good Luck Charlie (Disney Channel), The Fresh Beat Band (Nickelodeon), Kathy (Bravo), Crank Yankers, Wedding Band (TBS), the Billboard Music Awards, Bubble Guppies (Nick Jr.), The Howard Stern Show, Sesame Street, Comedy Central's Night of Too Many Stars, Robert Smigel's cartoons for Saturday Night Live, The Disney Parks Christmas Day Parade with Neil Patrick Harris, the Comedy Awards (Comedy Central), American Dreams, Stephen King's Kingdom Hospital, The In-Laws, The Man Show, Supernoobs, Too Late with Adam Carolla, The Dana Carvey Show, John Leguizamo's House Of Buggin', My Kind of Town, Johnny Test, and others. His songs have been licensed for use on numerous television series, including Scrubs, The Hills, Gossip Girl, Melrose Place, Felicity, Roswell, and others.

He wrote songs for and was executive music producer of the scripted comedy Crazy Ex-Girlfriend on The CW.

Production work
As a record producer and mixer, he worked with the Monkees, Fever High, Dashboard Confessional, Swirl 360, Tahiti 80, Motion City Soundtrack, Verve Pipe, Robert Plant, America, the Sounds, They Might Be Giants, Fastball, and many other artists, as well as producing or co-producing five Fountains of Wayne albums and six Ivy albums.

Side projects
Schlesinger was also in a side project band called Tinted Windows formed by guitarist James Iha, previously of The Smashing Pumpkins and A Perfect Circle, singer Taylor Hanson of Hanson, and Bun E. Carlos of Cheap Trick, and recorded and toured with them in 2009 and 2010. He also contributed to Iha's second solo album, Look to the Sky (2012).

He was the main composer and producer for Brooklyn-based synth-pop duo Fever High.

Awards and nominations
Schlesinger was nominated for an Academy Award and a Golden Globe Award in 1997 for writing the title track of the Tom Hanks-directed film That Thing You Do!, also contributing two other songs for the film.

Fountains of Wayne was nominated for two Grammy Awards in 2003 for Best New Artist and Best Pop Performance by a Duo or Group with Vocal for "Stacy's Mom".

Schlesinger and David Javerbaum received two Tony nominations in 2008 Best Musical and Best Original Score for the musical Cry-Baby. They also received a 2009 Emmy nomination for Outstanding Music and Lyrics for their song "Much Worse Things", performed by Elvis Costello and Stephen Colbert on the television special and album A Colbert Christmas: The Greatest Gift of All! The album, co-written by Schlesinger and Javerbaum, and co-produced by Schlesinger and Steven M. Gold, won the 2009 Grammy Award for Best Comedy Album.

Schlesinger received a 2013 Daytime Emmy nomination for Outstanding Original Song for his "Elmo the Musical" theme for Sesame Street. He and Molly Boylan received a 2011 Daytime Emmy nomination for the song "I Wonder" from Sesame Street.

Schlesinger and Javerbaum received a 2012 Emmy Award for Outstanding Music And Lyrics for their song "It's Not Just for Gays Anymore", performed by Neil Patrick Harris as the opening number of the 65th Tony Awards telecast; and a 2013 Emmy Award for Outstanding Music And Lyrics for their song "If I Had Time", performed by Neil Patrick Harris as the closing number of the 66th Tony Awards telecast.

Schlesinger received two 2016 Emmy nominations for his work on the CW series Crazy Ex-Girlfriend: Outstanding Original Music and Lyrics for "Settle for Me" (co-written with Rachel Bloom and Jack Dolgen), and Outstanding Main Title Theme (co-written with Rachel Bloom).

He received a 2017 Emmy nomination for Outstanding Original Music and Lyrics for "We Tapped That Ass" (co-written with Rachel Bloom and Jack Dolgen) from the CW series Crazy Ex-Girlfriend.

He won the 2019 Emmy Award for Outstanding Original Music and Lyrics for "Antidepressants Are So Not a Big Deal" and was nominated for Outstanding Original Main Title Theme Music for "Meet Rebecca" (Season 4 Theme) from Crazy Ex-Girlfriend (both co-written with Rachel Bloom and Jack Dolgen).

Personal life
On January 30, 1999, Schlesinger married Katherine Michel, a graphic designer and Yale graduate. They met in 1996 at WXOU Radio Bar, a bar that Schlesinger used to frequent with Fountains of Wayne co-founder Chris Collingwood when they were starting the band. They divorced in 2013. Schlesinger and Michel had two daughters, Sadie and Claire.

Death and tribute
On April 1, 2020, during the COVID-19 pandemic in the United States, Schlesinger died of complications from COVID-19 at a hospital in Poughkeepsie outside New York City at the age of 52. He had tested positive, and was hospitalized and placed on a ventilator for over a week before his death.

On June 16, 2020, the tribute album Saving for a Custom Van was released in Schlesinger's memory on Father/Daughter Records. The title is a reference to the Fountains of Wayne song "Utopia Parkway". The 31-track album features covers of songs Schlesinger wrote or performed by artists such as Kay Hanley, Ben Lee, and Prince Daddy & The Hyena. His collaborator Rachel Bloom and his Fountains of Wayne bandmate Jody Porter also participated. All proceeds from the album were donated to the MusiCares COVID-19 relief fund.

The 2021 revival of Johnny Test was dedicated to Schlesinger.

References

External links
 LAist Interview with Adam Schlesinger of Fountains of Wayne
 
 
 

1967 births
2020 deaths
20th-century American bass guitarists
20th-century American male musicians
21st-century American bass guitarists
21st-century American male musicians
American male bass guitarists
American rock bass guitarists
American musical theatre composers
Broadway composers and lyricists
Deaths from the COVID-19 pandemic in New York (state)
Fountains of Wayne members
Guitarists from New Jersey
Grammy Award winners
Jewish American musicians
Jewish American songwriters
Montclair High School (New Jersey) alumni
People from Montclair, New Jersey
Primetime Emmy Award winners
Songwriters from New Jersey
Tinted Windows (band) members
Williams College alumni